Elder Michaux is a religious TV show that aired on the DuMont Television Network, hosted by evangelist Lightfoot Solomon Michaux.

Broadcast history
The show was 30 minutes long, originated as a local program on DuMont station WTTG in Washington, D. C. in 1947, and aired on the DuMont network from October 17, 1948 to January 9, 1949. According to the book The Forgotten Network by David Weinstein (Temple University Press, 2004), the series also continued locally on WTTG after the network run ended, running to 1951 (see page 162).

The program was among the earliest U.S. television shows with an African American host, and included religious music and preaching.

Episode status
As with most DuMont series, no episodes are known to survive.

See also
List of programs broadcast by the DuMont Television Network
List of surviving DuMont Television Network broadcasts
Stained Glass Windows (ABC Television, 1948–49)
Lamp Unto My Feet (CBS Television, 1948–79)
Religious broadcasting

References

Bibliography
David Weinstein, The Forgotten Network: DuMont and the Birth of American Television (Philadelphia: Temple University Press, 2004) 
Alex McNeil, Total Television, Fourth edition (New York: Penguin Books, 1980) 
Tim Brooks and Earle Marsh, The Complete Directory to Prime Time Network TV Shows, Third edition (New York: Ballantine Books, 1964)

External links

DuMont historical website
Fall 1948 schedule at RadioDiscussions showing Elder Michaux on Sundays at 6pm ET

DuMont Television Network original programming
1948 American television series debuts
1949 American television series endings
Black-and-white American television shows
Television series about Christianity
Lost television shows
African-American television

no:Elder Michaux
tl:Elder Michaux